The Military Merit Cross (Militärverdienstkreuz) was established by Friedrich Franz II, Grand Duke of Mecklenburg-Schwerin on August 5, 1848.  Mecklenburg-Schwerin, a grand duchy located in northern Germany, was a member of the German Confederation and later the German Empire.

In several respects, Mecklenburg-Schwerin's Military Merit Cross was patterned after the Prussian Iron Cross.  Both came in two classes, a pinback 1st Class and a 2nd Class worn from a ribbon, both were awarded without regard to rank (most other orders and medals of both states were awarded in different classes based on the rank or status of the recipient), and both were awarded for specific campaigns, as indicated by a date on the bottom arm of the cross.  However, there were more versions of the Mecklenburg cross than of the Prussian cross (which was only awarded by Prussia in the Napoleonic Wars, the Franco-Prussian War and World War I, and by Nazi Germany in World War II).

The first versions were dated 1848 and 1849, and awarded for merit in the First War of Schleswig and in the suppression of the German Revolution of 1848-49 (some Mecklenburg troops were sent to Baden in 1849 while others remained in the fighting in Schleswig).  In 1859, some Mecklenburg observers and Austrian officers were decorated for merit during the Second Italian War of Independence.  The next version was dated 1864, and recognized merit in the Second War of Schleswig, also called the German-Danish War.  Mecklenburg-Schwerin's participation on the side of Prussia and other north German states in the Austro-Prussian War led to the next version, dated 1866.  

An 1870 version was created for the Franco-Prussian War, where Mecklenburg troops fought as part of the 17. Division. In this war, a number of officers and soldiers received both the Iron Cross and the Mecklenburg-Schwerin Military Merit Cross.

The next version was dated 1877.  This was not awarded to Mecklenburgers (except for a few military observers), but to Russians and Romanians in the Russo-Turkish War (1877–1878).  Certain German states, especially Mecklenburg-Schwerin, were sympathetic to the Russian and Romanian cause, and had dynastic connections to both states.  Grand Duke Friedrich Franz II's grandmother was Grand Duchess Elena Pavlovna of Russia, his daughter was married to Tsar Alexander II of Russia's son, and his son and heir, Friedrich Franz III, would marry Grand Duchess Anastasia Mikhailovna of Russia in 1879.  The Romanian royal family was a branch of the Hohenzollerns, the ruling house of Prussia and the newly created German Empire. 

A version dated 1900 was struck for Mecklenburgers who had distinguished themselves in the Boxer Rebellion of 1900-01.  An undated version was then created, which was awarded for merit in various colonial conflicts of the first decade of the 20th century, including the Herero Wars (a series of brutal conflicts where some Germans displayed great bravery in fighting guerrillas from the Herero and other tribes, while other Germans perpetrated what has come to be seen as the genocide of the Herero people).

Germany entered World War I in the first days of August 1914. On February 28, 1915, Friedrich Franz IV, Grand Duke of Mecklenburg-Schwerin, reauthorized the Military Merit Cross. The new version was dated 1914 and awards were made retroactively to the beginning of the war.  Both classes of the Military Merit Cross continued to be awarded throughout the war, both to Mecklenburgers and to soldiers of other German states and German allies.  Upon Friedrich Franz IV's abdication on November 14, 1918, the Military Merit Cross became obsolete.  It continued to be permitted for wear by those who had received it through the Weimar era, the Third Reich and in West Germany (it is unclear whether East Germany permitted the wear of any Imperial German decorations).

Description

In all its versions, the Mecklenburg-Schwerin Military Merit Cross was a bronze gilt cross pattée ins design, similar to the Iron Cross but with slightly narrower arms. The obverse bore a crown on the upper arm, the initials of Friedrich Franz in the center, and the date (except for the colonial version) at the bottom of the lower arm.  The reverse of the 2nd Class bore the legend "Für Auszeichnung im Kriege" ("For distinction in the war").  The reverse of the 1st Class, a pinback cross (Steckkreuz), was blank.  

The ribbon was light blue with narrow edge stripes of yellow and red (with the red stripes on the outside).  For awards to non-combatants, the same cross was worn, but the ribbon was changed to red with light blue and yellow edge stripes.

Notable recipients

 Albrecht, Duke of Württemberg (1914 1st and 2nd Class) - German field marshal in World War I.
 Fedor von Bock (1914 2nd Class) - also received the Pour le Mérite; later a field marshal in World War II.
 Kuno-Hans von Both (1914 1st and 2nd Class) - also received the Pour le Mérite; later a General der Infanterie in World War II
 Berthold von Deimling (1914 2nd Class) - German general in World War I who became a pacifist.
 Nikolaus von Falkenhorst (1914 2nd Class) - later a general in World War II.
 Friedrich Franz II, Grand Duke of Mecklenburg-Schwerin (1870(?) 1st and 2nd Class) - Grand Duke and general who commanded German troops in the Loire campaign in the Franco-Prussian War.
 Friedrich Franz III, Grand Duke of Mecklenburg-Schwerin (1870 2nd Class) - Heir to the throne and later Grand Duke.
 Archduke Friedrich, Duke of Teschen (1914 1st and 2nd Class) - Austro-Hungarian field marshal in World War I.
 Paul von Hindenburg (1914 1st and 2nd Class) - German field marshal in World War I.
 Franz Ritter von Hipper (1914 2nd Class) - German admiral and commander of battlecruisers at the Battle of Jutland; also received the Pour le Mérite and Military Max Joseph Order.
 Günther von Kluge (1914 2nd Class) - later a field marshal in World War II.
 Wilhelm Ritter von Leeb (1914 2nd Class) - also received the Military Max Joseph Order, Bavaria's highest military honor; later a field marshal in World War II.
 Erich Ludendorff (1914 2nd Class) - German general in World War I (may also have received 1st Class)
 August von Mackensen (1914 1st and 2nd Class) - German field marshal in World War I.
 Helmuth von Moltke the Elder (1870(?) 1st and 2nd Class) - German field marshal
 Karl August Nerger (1900 2nd Class, 1914 1st and 2nd Class) - Commander of the auxiliary cruiser SMS Wolf
 Reinhard Scheer (1914 1st and 2nd Class) - German admiral and commander at the Battle of Jutland
 Rupprecht, Crown Prince of Bavaria (1914 1st and 2nd Class) - German field marshal in World War I.
 Count Alfred von Schlieffen (1870 1st and 2nd Class) - Later Chief of the General Staff and author of the "Schlieffen Plan".
 Heinrich von Vietinghoff (1914 2nd Class) - later a general in World War II.
 Kaiser Wilhelm II (1914 1st and 2nd Class) - German Emperor and King of Prussia
 Wilhelm Deutscher Kronprinz (1914 1st and 2nd Class) - Crown Prince of Germany and Prussia; German general in World War I.
 Friedrich Paulus  (1st and 2nd Class) - Later German field marshal in World War II.

References

 Dr. Kurt-Gerhard Klietmann, Pour le Mérite und Tapferkeitsmedaille (1966)
 Jörg Nimmergut, Deutsche Orden und Ehrenzeichen bis 1945, Vol. 2 (1997)
 Neal W O'Connor, Aviation Awards of Imperial Germany and the Men Who Earned Them, Volume VII (2002)
 
Orders, decorations, and medals of Mecklenburg-Schwerin
Awards established in 1848